Sandra Alter  (born 10 January 1972) is a German former footballer. She was a member of the Germany women's national football team in 1991. On club level she played for Duisburg.

References

External links
 
 Profile at soccerdonna.de

1972 births
Living people
German women's footballers
Place of birth missing (living people)
Germany women's international footballers
Women's association football goalkeepers